Mimi Page (born February 2, 1987) is an American singer-songwriter, record producer and composer.

Musical style
Page's original music blends ethereal vocals with piano-driven, atmospheric soundscapes. She attributes her ethereal sound to her use of reverb, delay, and layering techniques in post production. Page's primary instruments are the piano and synthesizer with production and beat creation in Logic Pro.

Life and career

1987–2007
Mimi Page was born in Los Angeles on February 2, 1987. Page was raised by her mother Cheryl Clark, a "triple threat" dancer who performed and toured in acclaimed Broadway shows Chicago, A Chorus Line and Pippin. From age 2–5, Page accompanied her mother on multiple international tours. On her early years, Page reflects; "We pretty much lived as nomads in hotels and on the tour bus. I'd rehearse her lines with her which helped me learn how to read. I attribute a lot of my creativity to my childhood as I was constantly surrounded by music and dancing." Page then relocated to a suburban area of Las Vegas to begin grade school and attain a stable living environment. At age 5, she began composing on the piano. At age 11, Page returned to Los Angeles. At 16, she transferred to the Alexander Hamilton Music Academy to pursue her training on the piano. She continued to compose instrumental music, but concealed her desire to sing due to shyness. Page shifted her artistic focus dramatically when discovering the Electronic Music program at the school. After learning to digitally record and manipulate her vocals in class, Page began recording and producing her own original music. During her senior year of high school Page self-released a collection of the songs recorded in her class and publicly shared them on Myspace. In 2006, Page attended college at the University of California, Santa Cruz to further her studies in Composition and Electronic Music. In 2007 she left the university and moved to Hollywood to study recording engineering at Musician's Institute. On the shift of studies, Page says "I wanted to get away from the formal structure of classical music and learn more of the techniques of recording. It's really tough when you’re an up and coming artist to afford studio time, so I wanted to be able to cheaply build my own studio and produce my own albums." During this time, Page continued to upload original music through Myspace, YouTube, and Facebook, which were all recorded and produced in her studio apartment.

2008–2012

After submitting her demos to multiple radio stations, Page gained airplay on Sirius/XM Chill and Soma FM Lush with several of her unreleased songs. May 2010 Page digitally self-released her first EP A Lullaby for the Lonely through CD Baby (which originally included singles "New" and "Come What May"). In August she released two additional singles, "Gravity" and "This Fire". MTV's The Real World licensed "This Fire" in an episode which launched the song to No. 11 on iTunes and No. 1 on Amazon.com's electronic charts. Page was then approached by bass music record label Simplify. Recordings and offered a one-album deal for a remix album for her songs off of "A Lullaby For The Lonely" and given two options; to be remixed exclusively by the label's top producers, or host a remix contest and allow both established and novice producers to submit. Page chose to throw the remix contest and made her vocal stems downloadable to the public for a limited time. As a result, multiple EDM Blogs promoted the contest and hundreds of entries were received. Both Page and the label chose the top 12 and on June 8, 2011, the album "Harmonious Heartbeats" was released. Following the album release, Page proceeded to collaborate on original material with several of the remixers on "Harmonious Heartbeats". In July 2011, a collaboration between Page and Shotgun Radio titled "A Bad Place" was independently released. Simplify. Recordings offered a second remix album deal for the single.

Page then teamed up with Warren Huart to finish her full-length record Breathe Me In. Originally intended for another self-release, Page funded the album production with fan donations through Kickstarter.com. In August 2011, she was offered a distribution deal for Breathe Me In by record label Gonzo Multimedia (the umbrella company of Voice Print Records). To anticipate the album, Gonzo Multimedia re-released "This Fire" on a new EP on December 1, 2011. On February 14, 2012, Breathe Me In was released on Gonzo Multimedia's new imprint Hunter Records. The album received positive reviews in the music blogosphere. Stereo Subversion magazine describes Breathe Me In as "a potent mix of sultry down tempo numbers, emotional pop-tronica, and thought-provoking ballads. Her vocals draw you in like a tractor beam, and the musical variety is downright dizzying." The Indie Times notes "Page's haunting, yet sensual vocals keep you fixated with each song you hear." Electronic Music Blog "The Untz" ranked her No. 2 on their list of "Top 15 Producers with Pipes."

A remix of "A Bad Place" by dubstep producer Minnesota caught the ear of Lorin Ashton (Bassnectar) and was added to his "Amorphous Music Mixtape Volume 7" release. Ashton subsequently contacted Page and asked her to co-write a song for his upcoming album Vava Voom. In April 2012 their collaboration "Butterfly" was released as track 9 on Vava Voom. Vava Voom debuted at No. 34 on the Billboard Top 200 charts. In a review of Vava Voom, music critic Jim DeRogatis described Page's vocals on "Butterfly" as "gorgeous." A second collaboration with Page, Bassnectar and British Drum and Bass duo DC Breaks titled "Breathless" was released on Ashton's "Freestyle EP" in October 2012 which debuted at No. 1 on iTunes Electronic Charts, No. 79 on the Billboard Top 200 charts and attained airplay on BBC Radio 1. In February 2013 FOX's television series The Following featured "Butterfly" in episode "The Fall" and launched "Butterfly" up to No. 4 on iTunes' Electronic charts. "Butterfly" gained radio play on Sirius/XM Chill, KCRW, and other syndicated stations. Billboard placed "Butterfly" at number 4 on their list of Top 10 Bassnectar songs.

2013–2015

Page's music garnered the attention of Zak Bagans, creator and star of Travel Channel's series Ghost Adventures, and was invited to write an original song for his show. Page recorded and produced an original song titled "Requiem" which has since been used as a recurring theme in multiple episodes of season 7 and season 8, most notably in the "New Orleans" episode which centered around the devastation of Hurricane Katrina. She additionally appeared as a guest investigator in season 7's "The Glen Tavern Inn" episode and accompanied actress Brit Morgan, Zak Bagans, and the rest of the cast for an overnight "lockdown" of the haunted hotel. In March 2013, she self-released the Requiem EP featuring "Requiem" and a new original song, "Treading the Abyss", which gained airplay on Sirius/XM Chill. Music blog Heartache with Hard Work ranked Requiem No. 26 on their list of "top 30 albums of 2013", expressing "Treading the Abyss" as "a spare percussive core with otherworldly vocals and what may be the greatest EDM hook I can think of."

May 2013, Page, Minnesota, and Seven Lions released their collaborative single "Fevers" on Skrillex's label Owsla. The single gained airplay on Sirius/XM BPM and Electric Area. September 2013, Page's collaboration "Lost in Me" with Paris Blohm debuted on Trance label Enhanced Music which gained airplay on both Sirius/XM BPM and Electric Area stations and received a wide array of support by EDM heavyweights Tiesto, BT and Tritonal. The Untz ranked Page No. 3 on their list of "Top 10 Female EDM Artists" quoting: "Most people associate the name Mimi Page with her illustrious collection of vocal features for artists like Seven Lions, Bassnectar, and Kezwik, but there is so much more to the young singer than meets the eye. Or ear in this case. The ever-evolving musician has released an album and multiple EPs apart from the confines of traditional dance music, creating a bewitching amalgam of dreamy instrumentations and disarmingly beautiful melodies."

On November 13, 2015, Page released her second studio album The Ethereal Blues, which she self-produced and released on her own label. Blog "Heartache for Hard Work" ranked it No. 3 on their annual list of top albums of 2015 describing it as "orchestral sweeps, trip-hop beats, lyrics that speak of a deep well of sadness, but which elevate rather than weigh down. It's also truly an album to be experienced in totality. For all the wondrous beauty of the individual components, the true genius is in the careful layering of possibilities from song to song. The process is dialectical: endlessly provocative, eternally haunting".

Page's collaboration with composer Inon Zur "The Path of Destiny", the theme song for the video game Sword Coast Legends, was nominated for a Hollywood Music in Media Award. Another collaboration with Rhys Fulber of Conjure One called "Oceanic" opened Armin van Buuren's A State of Trance podcast to promote Conjure One's new album Holoscenic which peaked at No. 14 on Billboard's Dance/Electronic album charts.

2016–present

In May 2016, Page collaborated with composer Inon Zur on "Song of the Fog", a cue in the score of Fallout 4's DLC Far Harbor. In September the band Delerium released their 15th studio album Mythologie with four songs co-written and performed by Page. The album debuted at number 7 on the Billboard Dance/Electronic album charts. August 2016, Page released her original score of The Trade, a documentary about the life and career of CZW wrestler Sick Nick Mondo. In April 2017, Page collaborated with composer Gareth Coker as the character of Black Jack for his score of Insomniac Games' VR release The Unspoken. May 2017, video game developer Riot Games features "Butterfly" in their League of Legends promotional animation video for their champion Lux titled "Lux: Binding Light", animated by Glen Keane. June 2017, Page collaborated with Bassnectar on the single "Was Will Be" on his EP Reflective Part 1. In December 2017, Page released her third solo EP Hope For The Haunted. Her 4th solo EP "Dark Before the Dawn" was  released on November 11, 2018, with an announcement of a new full-length album "Echoes of Eternity."

Live performances
In support of the release of Breathe Me In, Page toured the east coast as the opening support for Jefferson Starship on Paul Kantner's 71st birthday tour. Page has also performed her collaborative songs live, most notably "Butterfly" with Bassnectar at the Do Lab's 2012 Lightning in a Bottle Festival, Red Rocks Amphitheatre, and Nashville's Bridgestone Arena.

Discography

Solo studio albums

Filmography

Film and television

Video games

Collaborations

Awards and nominations

References

External links
 Official site
 Official Facebook

1987 births
Living people
Alexander Hamilton High School (Los Angeles) alumni
American women singer-songwriters
American singer-songwriters
Musicians Institute alumni
21st-century American singers
21st-century American women singers